is a Japanese visual kei rock band originally formed in 1996. They are known for their energetic music and live shows, as well as their eccentric cosplay-like outfits. The band is also known for its dedication to humanitarian aid, visiting orphanages and typhoon-ravaged areas in the Philippines.

To date, the band has released ten albums, thirty-three singles and four foreign song cover videos. Their highest charting on the Oricon album chart is number 73 for METEORS.

UchuSentai:Noiz were contestants on I Love OPM, the ABS-CBN's singing reality competition for non-Filipinos who perform original Pilipino music; the band was part of the Top 24 of the competition.

History

Founding as Noiz and early years (1996–2002) 
Original members S@TT-ON and ANGEL-TAKA formed the band in 1996, originally named NOIZ. In 1999, former roadie MASATO was included into the band, and NOIZ released a mini album entitled Imitation PoPs in March of that year. In 2002, the concept of the band being a group of space warriors (宇宙戦隊 uchuu sentai) was introduced.

Imitation PoPs UchuSentai:Noiz (2002–2007)
The group released their first full-length album release,  under the name  in the year 2003 with the members KYO and TAKEswiy as bassist and guitarist, respectively. Their second album release,  debuted on the Oricon album chart at number 240, while their third album EGO-Style broke the top 100 Oricon rankings in 2005.

UchuSentai:Noiz and lineup change (2007–2009) 
The official fan club Miracle Rocket was launched in February 2007. The album Cube was released in October 2008, the band's last studio release with the five original band members. A compilation album, GREAT ROCK N ROLL HEROES was released in 2009, before members S@TT-ON and TAKEswiy announced their departure from the band, to be replaced by members KOTARO (guitar) and YAMATO (drums).

GENOM EMOTION, IMP, HIGH FIVE and "Narda" (2009–2012) 
With the new lineup, the band released the free full-length album release GENOM EMOTION on November 9, 2010 on their official website. The year 2011 saw the release of the album IMP, as well as the final tour performance DVD JAPAN TOY'S PANIC TOUR KING OF ONEMAN & EVENT SHOW 2011 GENOM EMOTION FINAL ATTACK AT SHIBUYA O-EAST featuring the songs from GENOM EMOTION. The band released a mini album, HIGH FIVE, on May 2, 2012, before releasing a music video covering the Filipino rock band Kamikazee’s Narda in August to launch their Philippine tour.

METEORS and untitled album (2012–present) 
Following their Philippine tour, the band released the full-length album ‘METEORS’ in September 2012 as UCHUSENTAI:NOIZ. In 2013, the band released the singles PRECOG, Parallel Mind, Corona, One Order and Laika, as well as the tour performance album METEORS FINAL ATTACK AT OSAKA Bigcat. The band's vocalist ANGEL-TAKA set out on a humanitarian mission to Tacloban, Philippines in December 2013, visiting the victims of Typhoon Yolanda (international name Haiyan) and sending school supplies to elementary school children.

A trilogy of videos was released in April 2014, featuring covers of Filipino songs: Liwanag sa Dilim by Rivermaya, Superhero by Rocksteddy, and Pinoy Ako by Orange and Lemons, to raise support for the victims of Typhoon Yolanda. UchuSentai:NOIZ returned to the Philippines in May 2014 to perform at the Best of Anime 2014 -Summer Live!- events in Manila and Davao City as well as announce their plans for a Philippine album release featuring the Filipino version of the song Happy tied and an English version of the song , along with new original compositions.

Band members

Current members
ANGEL-TAKA (ANGEL VOICE MESSENGER) — lead vocals  
MASATO (HYPER SONIC GUITAR) — guitar, vocals
叫 (Kyo) (SUPER VIBRATOR) — bass
呼太郎 (Kotaro) (NEO ECCENTRIC GUITAR) — guitar (2009–present)
YAMATO (MACHINEGUN BEAT GRAPPLER) — drums (2009–present)

Former members
TAKEswiy (CLOCKWORK GUITAR) — guitar 
S@TT-on (MIX BEAT CREATOR) — drums
TAKAYA — guitar (original lineup as NOIZ)
MANAV — bass (original lineup as NOIZ)

Discography

Albums as UchuSentai: NOIZ

Singles

DVDs and Compilation Albums as UchuSentai:Noiz

Albums under the name Imitation Pops UchuSentai:Noiz

Singles and demos under the name Imitation Pops UchuSentai:Noiz

References

External links
 Uchusentai:NOIZ(宇宙戦隊NOIZ) Official Website
 宇宙戦隊NOIZ(UchusentaiNOIZ) Official Facebook

Cosplay
J-pop
Japanese rock music groups
Visual kei musical groups